Colonel Ralph Stewart-Wilson (26 January 1923 – 2 February 2015) was a Scottish landowner and soldier of the 7th Battalion the Rifle Brigade who won the Military Cross in Italy in 1944.

Born in Perthshire, he began life as Ralph Stewart Hood Wilson, the elder son of Aubyn Harold Raymond Wilson and his wife Muriel Athelstan Hood Stewart of Balnakeilly, of Moncreiffe House, Dunbarny, Perthshire. The young Stewart-Wilson was educated at Eton College.

His brother Blair Aubyn Wilson was born in 1929. In May 1934, their father died while living in Australia.

In 1941 he left Eton and was commissioned into the Rifle Brigade. On 5 December 1944 he was awarded the Military Cross for his reconnaissance work under heavy fire during the advance on Aquino.

Stewart-Wilson saw further active service in Kenya and Malaya in the 1950s. He retired from the Army in 1971, with the rank of Colonel.

Following the death of his mother in 1982, he was laird of Balnakeilly, near Pitlochry, in Perthshire, and died there on 2 February 2015.

References 

People from Perthshire
Recipients of the Military Cross
Scottish landowners
Rifle Brigade officers
1923 births
2015 deaths
Staffordshire Regiment officers
British military personnel of the Mau Mau Uprising
British Army personnel of the Malayan Emergency
People educated at Eton College
Members of the Royal Company of Archers
Lairds
20th-century Scottish businesspeople